Alison Statton (born March 1958) is a Welsh singer best known for her work with Young Marble Giants. Fans of the singer have included Kurt Cobain, Courtney Love, Stephin Merritt, Belle and Sebastian and Renato Russo.

Musical career
Born in Cardiff, Statton's career in music began in 1978 as the singer for the band Young Marble Giants. After Young Marble Giants split up in 1981, she formed the jazz-influenced band Weekend with Simon Emmerson (Booth) and Spike Williams, releasing the album La Varieté in 1982 and a live EP, Live at Ronnie Scott's, the following year.

Statton returned to Cardiff and trained to be a chiropractor while teaching t'ai chi.

She returned to music in the late 1980s and released two recordings with the guitarist from Ludus, Ian Devine as 'Devine and Statton', The Prince of Wales (1989) and Cardiffians (1990).

After working with Devine, she released several records with Spike in the 1990s, starting with Weekend in Wales (1993).

Young Marble Giants reunited for a number of live performances from 2007 to 2015 in Europe, the last one in London at the Royal Festival Hall during the Meltdown Festival curated by David Byrne.

Statton's singing has been called "coolly unadorned", cool and dispassionate, and ghostly and fragile, with a "shy, singsong delivery". Her vocal style is considered influential on many of the indie pop artists that followed.

She presently works as a chiropractor.

Recordings

With Young Marble Giants
Colossal Youth (1980), Rough Trade
Salad Days (2000), Vinyl Japan
Live at the Hurrah (2004), Cherry Red
Colossal Youth & Collected Works (2007), Domino

With Weekend
La Variete (1982), Rough Trade
Live at Ronnie Scott's (1983), Rough Trade
Archive (2003), Vinyl Japan

Devine and Statton
The Prince of Wales (1988), Les Disques du Crépuscule
Cardiffians (1990), Les Disques Du Crépuscule

With Spike
Weekend in Wales (1993), Vinyl Japan
Tidal Blues (1994), Vinyl Japan
Maple Snow (1995), Vinyl Japan
The Shady Tree (1997), Vinyl Japan
Bimini Twist (2018), Tiny Global Productions

Other appearances
The Gist – Embrace the Herd (1982): vocals on "Clean Bridges"
Stuart Moxham & The Original Artists – Signal Path (1992): vocals on "Knives (Always Fall)"

References

External links
Alison Statton at LTM Recordings
Alison Statton and Spike biography

1959 births
Living people
Singers from Cardiff
Women new wave singers
20th-century Welsh women singers
Welsh new wave musicians